Thomas Thorn Flagler (October 12, 1811 – September 6, 1897) was a U.S. Representative from New York.

Born in Pleasant Valley, New York, Flagler attended the local schools.  He learned the printer's trade and became one of the owners and publishers of the Chenango Republican in Oxford, New York.  In 1836 Flagler moved to Lockport, New York, where he published the Niagara Courier until 1842 when he entered the hardware business.

A Whig, Flagler served as member of the New York State Assembly in 1842 and 1843, and Treasurer of Niagara County between 1849 and 1852.

Flagler was elected as a Whig to the Thirty-third Congress and reelected as an Opposition Party candidate to the Thirty-fourth Congress (March 4, 1853 – March 3, 1857).

He was not a candidate for renomination in 1856 and resumed former business pursuits.  In 1859, together with inventor Birdsill Holly (1820–1893), he founded the Holly Manufacturing Company, makers of Holly's patented fire hydrants.  Flagler was also active in other businesses, including Lockport's gaslight company, the Niagara County Bank, and the Lockport and Erie Railroad.

By now a Republican, he was again a member of the Assembly in 1860, and he was a Delegate to the state constitutional convention in 1867 and 1868.

He died in Lockport, New York, on September 6, 1897, and was interred in Glenwood Cemetery.

References

Rochester Democrat and Chronicle, The Death of Hon. T. T. Flagler, September 7, 1897

1811 births
1897 deaths
People from Pleasant Valley, New York
Whig Party members of the United States House of Representatives from New York (state)
Opposition Party members of the United States House of Representatives from New York (state)
New York (state) Republicans
Members of the New York State Assembly
Politicians from Lockport, New York
19th-century American politicians